Hussein Mahmood Jeeb Tehar Gass is an album by Muslimgauze. The CD booklet is a multi fold out poster with photographs by Shirin Neshat, including her "Offered Eyes" (1993) on the front cover and "Grace Under Duty" (1994) and "Rebellious Silence" (1994) inside. It was released one day after Bryn Jones's death.

Track listing
"Bilechik Mule" – 5:37
"Hussein Mahmood Jeeb Tehar Gass" – 6:55
"Nazareth Arab" – 6:34
"Sarin Odour" – 6:46
"Turkish Purdah" – 7:54
"Minarets of America" – 0:56
"Istanbul" – 9:27
"Uzi Mahmood 7" – 4:23
"Uzi Mahmood 12" – 9:36

External links
http://www.discogs.com/release/9383

Muslimgauze albums